The Union Station built in 1930 in Atlanta was the smaller of two principal train stations in downtown, Terminal Station being the other (the latter served  Southern Railway, Seaboard Air Line, Central of Georgia (including the Nancy Hanks to Savannah), and the Atlanta and West Point). It was the third "union station" or "union depot" (usage varied in the 19th century), succeeding the 1853 station, burned in mid-November 1864 when Federal forces left Atlanta for the March to the Sea, and the 1871 station.

Overview
The station was located over the tracks between Forsyth and Spring Streets, three blocks west and one block south of the predecessor union stations. The site is the block immediately west of Five Points MARTA station.

Opening in 1930, the third Union Station served the Georgia Railroad, Atlantic Coast Line (previously the Atlanta, Birmingham and Coast Railroad), and Louisville and Nashville (previously the Nashville, Chattanooga and St. Louis Railway). It replaced earlier stations on the same site.

Major trains and destinations:
Atlantic Coast Line -in partnership with L&N:
The Dixie Flagler – Chicago, via Chattanooga, TN, Nashville, TN and Evansville, IN; continuing south to Jacksonville and Miami, FL
The Dixie Flyer – Chicago, via Chattanooga, TN, Nashville, TN and Evansville, IN; continuing south to Jacksonville and Tampa, FL; shortened in 1965 to an Atlanta to Jacksonville ACL route

Georgia Railroad:
Trains to Augusta, GA for connecting trains to Atlantic Coast Line Railroad service (e.g., Palmetto) and to Southern Railway service (Aiken-Augusta Special)

Louisville and Nashville:
The Flamingo – Cincinnati, via Knoxville, TN; continuing south to Jacksonville, FL, via Albany
The Georgian – Chicago, via Nashville and Evansville
The Southland - Chicago, via Cincinnati, OH, Knoxville, TN; continuing south to Macon, then branching to various points in Florida. This train traveled to Terminal Station before going south to Trilby and Florida.

Additionally, the Georgia Railroad operated local service between Atlanta and Augusta.

After the tenant railroads of Union Station had discontinued all their passenger trains (the last such train operated on April 30, 1971, the day before Amtrak came into existence), the station was razed in 1972. Remnants of the platform may be seen behind the Atlanta Journal-Constitution building although construction of Underground Atlanta and MARTA largely obliterated the site.

References

 

Former railway stations in Georgia (U.S. state)
Union stations in the United States
Railway stations in the United States opened in 1930
Railway stations in Georgia (U.S. state)
Railway stations in Atlanta
Atlantic Coast Line Railroad stations
Former Louisville and Nashville Railroad stations
Demolished railway stations in the United States
Demolished buildings and structures in Atlanta
Railway stations closed in 1970
Buildings and structures demolished in 1972